The George Peters House is a historic house in Black Creek, Wisconsin, United States. The house was built in 1909 and was added to the National Register of Historic Places on June 18, 1987.

Location
The house is located at 305 N. Maple Street in Black Creek, Wisconsin, near the intersection of North Maple Street and West State Street (WIS 54). It is in an area of Black Creek where houses range from 100 years old to 140 years old.

Restoration
This residence was restored between 2008 and 2010.

References

External links
National Register of Historic Places

American Craftsman architecture in Wisconsin
Bungalow architecture in Wisconsin
Houses in Outagamie County, Wisconsin
Houses on the National Register of Historic Places in Wisconsin
National Register of Historic Places in Outagamie County, Wisconsin
Houses completed in 1909